"Aunt Dahlia, Cornelia And Madeline" is the sixth episode of the third series of the 1990s British comedy television series Jeeves and Wooster. It is also called "Comrade Bingo".

In the US, it was aired as the fourth episode of the second series of Jeeves and Wooster on Masterpiece Theatre, on 17 January 1993.

Background 
Adapted from "Comrade Bingo" (collected in The Inimitable Jeeves) and "Jeeves Makes an Omelette" (collected in A Few Quick Ones).

Cast
 Bertie Wooster – Hugh Laurie
 Jeeves – Stephen Fry
 Spode – John Turner
 Aunt Dahlia – Patricia Lawrence
 Bingo Little – Pip Torrens
 Madeline Bassett – Elizabeth Morton
 Charlotte – Rachel Robertson
 Mr. Rowbotham – Peter Benson
 Comrade Butt – Colin Higgins
 Lord Bittlesham – Geoffrey Toone
 Lady Bittlesham – Brenda Kempner
 Cornelia – Ann Queensberry

Plot
Bingo Little has joined The Red Dawn, an outspoken Communist group, to be near Charlotte Rowbotham, with whom he is in love. Bertie is pushed by Aunt Dahlia into going to Marsham Manor (near Goodwood) with her so she can get Cornelia Fothergill to sign her latest novel to her, so she can use it in her magazine. However, she doesn't tell Bertie that she wants him to steal a painting to accomplish this (we see why Bertie would never have made it as a burglar). Roderick Spode is also there, now the seventh earl of Sidcup (the sixth Earl having died) and is giving a farewell tour to his Black Shorts.

See also
 List of Jeeves and Wooster characters

References

External links
 

Jeeves and Wooster episodes
1992 British television episodes